Siguinoguin is a town in the Boromo Department of Balé Province in south-western Burkina Faso. The town has a population of 1407.

References

Populated places in the Boucle du Mouhoun Region
Balé Province